Baribeau is the surname of the following people

Eloi Baribeau (1906-1957), Canadian politician in Quebec
Jean-Louis Baribeau (1893-1975), Canadian politician
Paul Baribeau, American folk punk singer
Théodore Baribeau (1870-1937), Canadian politician in Quebec